Punta de Tarifa or Punta Marroquí (Tarifa Point or Moroccan Point) is the southernmost point of the Iberian Peninsula and Continental Europe. It is located in the province of Cádiz and the autonomous community of Andalusia on the Atlantic end of the Straits of Gibraltar. The coast of Morocco can be seen from this point.

The point is the southeastern tip of the former island, known as Isla de Tarifa or Isla de Las Palomas, located offshore and now connected to the mainland by a causeway. The island was occupied by a military installation between the 1930s and 2001.

The name of Tarifa, both for the island and for the municipality, originates from Tarif ibn Malik, who in 711 started here the Islamic conquest of Hispania.

References

External links

 Ferrer-Gallardo, X., Albet-Mas, A., & Espiñeira, K. (2014). The borderscape of Punta Tarifa: concurrent invisibilisation practices at Europe’s ultimate peninsula. cultural geographies, 1474474014547336.http://cgj.sagepub.com/content/22/3/539.full.pdf+html

Tarifa
Tarifa
Landforms of Andalusia
Tourism in Spain
Province of Cádiz
Extreme points of Spain